Louisiana Flip N Move is a show featured on DIY Network.

Premise
Louisiana Flip N Move is the spin-off of Texas Flip N Move. The show features professional home renovators who purchase older houses to flip for profit, in and around New Orleans, Louisiana.

Like the original show, the show features a twist:  at the auction, only the houses are sold (not the underlying land).  The bidders can only view the home from the outside and must also factor in costs of moving house from the original lot to the renovation site (another facility where the houses are renovated and later sold at auction to purchasers wanting houses to move to existing property, currently located in New Orleans metropolitan area).

The flippers do buy land on this show to place the house and remodel (unlike Texas FlipNMove where the land is (usually) not included at the final auction after the remodel) The land is included in the purchase of Louisiana Flip N Move. Before each auction it tells how much the land cost the move to the land and the remodel cost.

Series overview

Season 1

Season 2

See also
 Texas Flip N Move

References

External links
 Official Website

2016 American television series debuts
English-language television shows
Home renovation television series
DIY Network original programming